Machilipatnam railway station (station code:MTM) located in the Indian state of Andhra Pradesh, serves Machilipatnam in Krishna district. It is administered under Vijayawada railway division of South Coast Railway zone. The Vijayawada–Machilipatnam line was scheduled to be doubled by 2016. Machilipatnam railway station is categorized as a Non-Suburban Grade-5 (NSG-5) station in the Vijayawada railway division.

History 
In 2012–13, a survey report was submitted for new Machilipatnam–Repalle railway line.

Classification 
In terms of earnings and outward passengers handled, Machilipatnam is categorized as a Non-Suburban Grade-5 (NSG-5) railway station. Based on the re–categorization of Indian Railway stations for the period of 2017–18 and 2022–23, an NSG–5 category station earns between – crore and handles  passengers.

Station amenities 

It is one of the 38 stations in the division to be equipped with Automatic Ticket Vending Machines (ATVMs).

Originating Express Trains 

All trains originating from Machilipatnam must pass through Gudivada Jn.

References 

Railway stations in Krishna district
Vijayawada railway division
Transport in Machilipatnam
1908 establishments in India